Çağlayangedik is a small village in Mut district of Mersin Province, Turkey. It is situated to the west of D.715. The population of the village was 99 as of 2012. The main agricultural products of the village are apricot, fig and olive.

References

Villages in Mut District